Compucom Institute of Technology and Management (CITM) is an engineering and management college in Jaipur, Rajasthan.

CITM is approved by AICTE and affiliated to Rajasthan Technical University, Kota and Rajasthan University, Jaipur.

CITM offers B.Tech. (civil, electrical, computer, and electronics and communication engineering), BCA, MCA, MJMC and MBA courses.

See also
List of institutions of higher education in Rajasthan

References

Engineering colleges in Jaipur
Universities and colleges in Jaipur
Educational institutions established in 2001
2001 establishments in Rajasthan